Edward J. "Ed" Gearty (March 17, 1923 – September 25, 2009) was a Minnesota DFL politician, a former legislator, and a former President of the Minnesota Senate.

Gearty served on the Minneapolis Park Board before being elected to the Minnesota House of Representatives in 1962. He served four terms in the House before winning election to the Senate in 1970. While in the Senate, Gearty served as chair of the Governmental Operations and Elections committees. He was elected President of the Senate in 1977, and served in that role until his retirement.

In private life, Gearty worked as an attorney in private practice. He was married, and had one daughter. He died in 2009.

References

Presidents of the Minnesota Senate
Democratic Party Minnesota state senators
1923 births
2009 deaths
20th-century American politicians